Limnoctites is the genus of reedhaunters, birds in the family Furnariidae. It contains the following species:

 Straight-billed reedhaunter, Limnoctites rectirostris
 Sulphur-bearded reedhaunter, Limnoctites sulphuriferus

References

 

 
Bird genera
Taxa named by Carl Eduard Hellmayr